Muhammad Kusen (born April 6, 1977) is an Indonesian footballer who currently plays for Gresik United in the Indonesia Super League.

References

External links

1977 births
Association football midfielders
Living people
Indonesian footballers
Liga 1 (Indonesia) players
Deltras F.C. players
Gresik United players
Persebaya Surabaya players
Indonesian Premier Division players